Sameer Suneja is an Indian executive who is the current global CEO of confectionery manufacturer Perfetti Van Melle. He is the first non-Italian to head the third largest confectionery group in the world.

Biography
Suneja went to St. Xavier's Senior Secondary School, Delhi and graduated in 1989. He completed his masters from Indian Institute of Management Bangalore in 1994.

Suneja joined Colgate Palmolive as a brand manager in June 1994. He left Palmolive in January 1996 to join Frito Lay, where he worked for a little over a year. He joined Perfetti Van Melle in February 1997. He was promoted to the role of executive vice-president for global innovations and business development in August 2012. Later, he was appointed global CEO in August 2013.

References

Indian Institute of Management Bangalore alumni
Indian chief executives
Living people
Year of birth missing (living people)